Hurricane Daniel was the second strongest hurricane of the 2006 Pacific hurricane season. The storm affected Hawaii late in its lifetime, causing moderate rainfall and minor damage. The fourth named storm, third hurricane, and second major hurricane of the season, Daniel originated on July 16 from a tropical wave off the coast of Mexico. It tracked westward, intensifying steadily to reach peak winds of 150 mph (240 km/h) on July 22. At the time, the characteristics of the cyclone resembled those of an annular hurricane. Daniel gradually weakened as it entered an area of cooler water temperatures and increased wind shear, and after crossing into the Central Pacific Ocean, it quickly degenerated into a remnant low on July 26, before dissipating two days later.

Initial predictions suggested that the cyclone would pass through the Hawaiian Islands as a tropical storm; however, Daniel's remnants dissipated southeast of Hawaii. The storm brought light to moderate precipitation to the Island of Hawaii and Maui, causing minor flooding, although no major damage or fatalities were reported.

Meteorological history

Hurricane Daniel began as a tropical wave that moved off the west coast of Africa on July 2. The wave moved across the Atlantic Ocean and Caribbean Sea with little associated convection, and on July 12, it crossed Central America into the eastern Pacific Ocean. Convection increased on July 13, and two days later the system began to exhibit signs of tropical development to the south of Mexico. It tracked westward at about 15 mph (25 km/h), and on July 16, the disturbance became better organized. With convective rainbands near an associated low-level circulation, it is estimated the tropical wave spawned a tropical depression late on July 16. At the time, it was located about 525 miles (845 km) south-southwest of Manzanillo, Colima.

Classified as Tropical Depression Five-E, the system tracked westward under the steering currents of a mid-level ridge. In the hours after formation, the depression lacked a concentration of deep convection near the center. Conditions favored development, including warm sea surface temperatures, very low amounts of wind shear, and an established anticyclone over the cyclone. Convection became more centralized, coinciding with the improvement of upper-level outflow. Based on Dvorak classifications, it is estimated that the cyclone intensified into Tropical Storm Daniel at 12:00 UTC on July 17. Daniel quickly became better organized, exhibiting increased thunderstorm activity and banding features. A central dense overcast developed, and a well-defined rainband wrapped around the center of circulation. Based on the formation of an eye feature, the National Hurricane Center upgraded Daniel to hurricane status late on July 18 while it was located about 885 miles (1420 km) south-southwest of Cabo San Lucas.

On July 19, the eye of Daniel became apparent on satellite imagery, which organized into a pinhole eye. It underwent an eyewall replacement cycle as it turned to the west-northwest, temporarily halting its intensification trend, before quickly strengthening and attaining major hurricane status on July 20. Later that day, Hurricane Daniel organized into a very symmetric cyclone with a distinct eye about 30 miles (45 km) in diameter. Upon attaining Category 4 status on the Saffir-Simpson Hurricane Scale, the cyclone resembled the appearance of an annular hurricane; an annular hurricane is one with a large and symmetric eye, surrounded by a thick ring of intense convection, and usually is able to maintain its intensity and structure for several days. On July 21 the hurricane underwent another eyewall replacement cycle. After completing the cycle, Daniel attained its peak winds of 150 mph (240 km/h) early on July 22. It maintained peak winds for about 18 hours, and Daniel began a weakening trend as it crossed into an area of progressively cooler water temperatures. The eye became more distinct on July 23, before the cloud tops again warmed as the winds decreased.

The hurricane crossed into the area of forecast responsibility of the Central Pacific Hurricane Center on July 24, and upon doing so, its eye disappeared from satellite imagery. Daniel was forecast to track through the Hawaiian Islands as a tropical storm as water temperatures near the islands were warmer, and wind shear was expected to be minimal. However, it decelerated as the ridge to its north weakened, and due to the combination of cool waters and increasing easterly shear, Daniel weakened to a tropical storm on July 25. Later that day, no active convection remained near the exposed circulation center, and early on July 26, it weakened to tropical depression status. Thunderstorm activity failed to redevelop, and Daniel degenerated into a remnant low-pressure area by 00:00 UTC on July 27. The remnant low continued west-northwestward, dissipating just southeast of the Big Island of Hawaii on July 28.

Preparations and impact

When Hurricane Daniel was forecast to pass through the Hawaiian islands as a tropical storm, state and Hawaii County officials recommended residents prepare hurricane kits. They also suggested purchasing non-perishable foods and batteries. Initially, the storm was several days away from potentially affecting the state, and as a result, few residents rushed to prepare. The Honolulu National Weather Service issued a high surf advisory for east facing beaches in Hawaii, and warned beachgoers to remain out of the water. The National Weather Service issued a flash flood watch and wind advisory in association with the remnants of Daniel.

The remnants produced 2–5 inches (50–125 mm) of rainfall throughout windward areas of the Big Island of Hawaii and Maui on July 28 and 29. West Wailuaiki on Maui recorded 3.87 inches (98.3 mm) in one day, which was the highest daily rainfall total from the hurricane. The storm also dropped precipitation on the East Maui watershed. The rainfall particularly in Kailua-Kona on the Big Island caused ponding on roadways, as well as flooding of small streams. However, no injuries or serious damage were reported.

During the 61st Interdepartmental Hurricane Conference, the Hawaii State Civil Defense requested the retirement of the name Daniel, citing that it became one of the several storms memorable for threat or damage. However, the World Meteorological Organization did not approve the request.

See also

 List of Hawaii hurricanes
 Other tropical cyclones of the same name
 Timeline of the 2006 Pacific hurricane season
 List of Category 4 Pacific hurricanes
 Hurricane Hector (2018) Another strong category 4 annular hurricane with a similar track.

References

Daniel
Daniel (2006)
Daniel (2006)
2006 in Hawaii
July 2006 events in North America
July 2006 events in Oceania
Daniel